Damirchilar or Jraghatsner is a village in the Khojaly District of Azerbaijan, in the disputed region of Nagorno-Karabakh. The village had an ethnic Armenian-majority population prior to the 2020 Nagorno-Karabakh war, and also had an Armenian majority in 1989.

History 
During the Soviet period, the village was part of the Askeran District of the Nagorno-Karabakh Autonomous Oblast. After the First Nagorno-Karabakh War, the village was administrated as part of the Askeran Province of the breakaway Republic of Artsakh. The village was captured by Azerbaijan on 9 November 2020, during the 2020 Nagorno-Karabakh war.

Historical heritage sites 
Historical heritage sites in and around the village include the Banunts Church, the 13th-century church of Surb Vanes, and the church of Surb Astvatsatsin built in 1882.

Demographics 
The village had 117 inhabitants in 2005, and 132 inhabitants in 2015.

References

External links 
 

Populated places in Khojaly District
Populated places in Askeran Province
Nagorno-Karabakh